Ironville and Riddings is a ward in the Amber Valley district of Derbyshire, England.  The ward contains 15 listed buildings that are recorded in the National Heritage List for England.  Of these, one is listed at Grade II*, the middle of the three grades, and the others are at Grade II, the lowest grade. The ward contains the village of Riddings, part of the model village of Ironville, and the surrounding area.  In Riddings was a model farm, and buildings forming part of this are listed.  Other listed buildings include a church, houses, farmhouses and associated structures, public houses, and workers' cottages along the Cromford Canal.


Key

Buildings

See also
Listed buildings in Ironville

References

Citations

Sources

 

Lists of listed buildings in Derbyshire